The Noreán Formation (J1-2n, J1n) is a geological formation of the Eastern Ranges of the Colombian Andes, the Serranía de San Lucas and as basement underlying the southernmost Lower and northern Middle Magdalena Valleys. The formation consists of volcanic and pyroclastic lavas that range from andesites to rhyolites. Vitric, lithic and crystal tuffs and andesitic dikes and hypabyssal bodies are also present in the formation.

A positive anomaly of Pb suggests a subduction-related genesis dominated by explosive volcanism.

Etymology 
The type locality of the Noreán Formation is along the road between Buturama and Bombeadero in Aguachica.

Description 
The Noreán Formation is found in the northern part of the Eastern Ranges of the Colombian Andes, stretching from the Cesar Department in the north, towards the Serranía de San Lucas in Bolívar to the Santander Massif in Santander in the south. The formation forms the economic basement in the southern Lower Magdalena Valley (VIM) and the northern Middle Magdalena Valley (VMM). The formation is interpreted as characteristic of an important explosive volcanic phase, the materials of which were deposited in a graben setting of the Middle Magdalena Valley. The Early Jurassic basin was covered by a shallow sea and in part drained by rivers and lakes. The basin at time of deposition was bordered by a volcanic arc, characterized by basaltic to calc-alkaline magmas. The formation also comprises less than  thin very fine to fine sandstone beds constituting quartz (90 to 60%), feldspars (10 to 40%) and lithic fragments (1-2 %).

The volcanic and pyroclastic rocks of the Noreán Formation are composed of lavas that range from andesitic to rhyolitic, together with vitric, lithic and crystal tuffs. Mainly andesitic dikes and hypabyssal bodies are also present. Geochemically, the volcanic and pyroclastic rocks exhibit chemical similarities, belong to the calc-alkaline series and have negative anomalies of Nb, P and Ti and a positive anomaly of Pb, suggesting a subduction-related genesis.

U-Pb zircon geochronology resulted in ages of 192.4 ± 2.2 Ma in a basaltic andesite, 184.9 ± 2.0 Ma in an andesitic lava and 175.9 ± 1.1 Ma in a rhyolitic lava, indicating the occurrence of volcanic events in this section of the Noreán Formation from the Lower to the earliest Middle Jurassic. Zircon inheritance suggests that the volcanic arc was emplaced in a Meso- to Neoproterozoic basement. The Noreán Formation represents continental arc magmatism, which occurred during a phase of extensional tectonics along the continental margin of northwestern South America from approximately 195 to 168 Ma.

Stratigraphy 
To the northwest of the Santander Massif, the formation overlies the Bocas Formation and is unconformably overlain by the Tablazo Formation. In some locations in this area, the formation is found in faulted contact with the Bucaramanga Gneiss, La Virgen Formation and the Tablazo and La Luna Formations. In the Serranía de San Lucas, the Noreán Formation conformably overlies the Morrocoyal Formation and in this area is overlain by the Tablazo Formation and the Arenal Conglomeratic Unit. Across the San Lucas mountains, the formation is in faulted and discordant contact with the Norosí Batholith, the San Lucas Gneiss and the Sudán Formation.

The formation is offset by the megaregional Bucaramanga-Santa Marta Fault.

Subdivision 
On the western flanks of the Eastern Cordillera, the formation is subdivided into six units and in the Serranía de San Lucas into four (1, 3, 5 and 6 of the six named below), from young to old:
 Hypobyssal Andesitic Unit (Jnha) - 
 Effusive Rhyolitic Unit (Jner) - 
 Dacitic Effusive Unit (Jned) - 
 Pyroclastic and Effusive Dacitic Unit (Jnpd) - 
 Effusive Spherulitic Unit (Jnee) - 
 Pyroclastic-epiclastic Unit (Jnpe) -

Age 

The age of the Noreán Formation has been established using potassium-argon (K-Ar), rubidium-strontium (Rb-Sr), and uranium-lead dating (U-Pb). The first method gave an age range of 194 ± 6 Ma, the Rb-Sr dating method provided a range of 161 ± 27 Ma and U-Pb dating of zircons resulted in ages of 201.6 ± 3.6 and 196.1 ± 4.4. Refined dating of the formation performed in 2019 by Correa Martínez et al. concluded an age range between 192.4 ± 2.2 and 175.9 ± 1.1 Ma, spanning most of the Early Jurassic, from Sinemurian to Toarcian. The Noreán Formation was intruded by the San Lucas Granitoid in the Middle Jurassic, dated at 166.9 ± 6 Ma. A 2020 thermochronological study concluded that the Jurassic volcanic rocks covering the Santander Massif were exhumed during the latest Cretaceous to early Paleocene.

Outcrops 
The northernmost outcrop of the Noreán Formation is found in Chimichagua, Cesar. In Cesar, outcrops occur south of the village of Saloa and around the town of Pailitas, east of Tamalameque and Pelaya and west of La Gloria, in the western part of Morales, Bolívar, north and east of Aguachica where its type locality is situated, in the Serranía de San Lucas, where the urban center of Santa Rosa del Sur rests on top of the formation, in the west of San Pablo, Bolívar, and in the western part of Cantagallo, Bolívar.

Regional correlations 
In the Santander Massif, the Noreán Formation has been correlated to the Jordán Formation, while in the Serranía de San Lucas the formation correlates with and is partly overlying the Morrocoyal Formation. In the Sierra Nevada de Santa Marta of northern Colombia, the Noreán Formation is considered equivalent with the Guatapurí Formation, the Corual and Los Indios Formations and the ignimbrite complexes of Caja de Ahorros, La Paila and La Piña. In the Serranía del Perijá to the east of the extent of the formation, the Noreán Formation correlates with La Quinta Formation. In the La Guajira peninsula, the formation is time-equivalent with the Rancho Grande Formation while to the south of its area in the Upper Magdalena Valley the Noreán Formation is correlated with the Saldaña Formation. The Lower Jurassic is missing in the Llanos Basin to the southeast of the extent of the Eastern Cordillera.

See also 

 Geology of the Altiplano Cundiboyacense
 Geology of the Eastern Hills
 Cesar-Ranchería Basin, sedimentary basin to the northeast of the Noreán extent
 Central Atlantic magmatic province, megaregional igneous province of the Early Jurassic
 Nacientes del Biobío Formation, contemporaneous volcanic formation of central Chile and western Argentina
 Pan de Azúcar Formation, contemporaneous volcanic formation of northern Chile

Notes

References

Bibliography 

 
 
   Material was copied from this source, which is available under a Creative Commons Attribution 4.0 International License.

Maps 
 
 
 
 
 
 
 

Geologic formations of Colombia
Jurassic System of South America
Early Jurassic South America
Jurassic Colombia
Pliensbachian Stage
Sinemurian Stage
Toarcian Stage
Tuff formations
Jurassic volcanism
Fluvial deposits
Lacustrine deposits
Shallow marine deposits
Formations
Formations
Formations